A list of films produced in Egypt in 1968. For an A-Z list of films currently on Wikipedia, see :Category:Egyptian films.

1968

External links
 Egyptian films of 1968 at the Internet Movie Database
 Egyptian films of 1968 at elCinema.com

Lists of Egyptian films by year
1968 in Egypt
Lists of 1968 films by country or language